Carlos Claverie may refer to:

Carlos Claverie (swimmer) (born 1996), Venezuelan swimmer
Carlos Claverie (tennis) (born 1963), Venezuelan tennis player, father of above